Zofia Nałkowska (Warsaw, Congress Poland, 10 November 1884 – 17 December 1954, Warsaw) was a Polish prose writer, dramatist, and prolific essayist. She served as the executive member of the prestigious Polish Academy of Literature (1933–1939) during the interwar period.

Biography
Nałkowska was born into a family of intellectuals dedicated to issues of social justice, and studied at the clandestine Flying University under the Russian partition. Upon Poland's return to independence she became one of the country's most distinguished feminist writers of novels, novellas and stage-plays characterized by socio-realism and psychological depth.

Literary output
Nałkowska's first literary success was the Romans Teresy Hennert (The Romance of Teresa Hennert, 1923) followed by a slew of popular novels. She is best known for her books Granica (Boundary, 1935), the Węzły życia (Bonds of Life, 1948) and Medaliony (Medallions, 1947).

In her writing, Nałkowska boldly tackled difficult and controversial subjects, professing in her 1932 article "Organizacja erotyzmu" (Structure of Eroticism) published in the Wiadomości Literackie magazine – the premier literary periodical in Poland at the time –  that:
<blockquote>
...a rational, nay, intellectual approach to eroticism must be encouraged and strengthened, to allow for a consideration of eroticism in conjunction with other aspects of the life of the human community.  Eroticism is not a private matter of the individual.  It has its ramifications within all domains of human life and it is not possible to separate it from them by way of contemptuous disparagement in the name of morality, discretion, or yet by a demotion on the hierarchy of subjects worthy of intellectual attention: it cannot be isolated by prudery or relegated to science for its purely biological dimension."<ref>Zofia Nałkowska, "Organizacja erotyzmu", Wiadomości Literackie, vol. 9, No. 25 (442), 19 June 1932, p. 7. Quote in Polish: należy wymóc na sobie stosunek do zagadnień erotyzmu właśnie intelektualny, rozumowy, pozwalający je rozważać w splocie i wzajemnej zależności z innemi dziedzinami życia zbiorowego. Erotyzm nie jest prywatną sprawą człowieka. Wysyła on swe rozgałęzienia do wszystkich tych dziedzin i nie da się ani w imię wzgardliwego lekceważenia, ani moralności, ani dyskrecji, ani nawet w imię hierarchji tematów, godnych intelektualisty, od życia społecznego odciąć, nie da się w niem wstydliwie izolować i do swego zakresy ściśle biologicznego ograniczyć. (source)</ref></blockquote>

Tribute
On November 10, 2014, Google celebrated her 130th birthday with a Google Doodle.

Works
Novels
 Kobiety (Women, 1906), translated by Michael Henry Dziewicki, 1920
 Książę (The Prince, 1907)
 Rówieśnice (Contemporaries, 1909)
 Narcyza (1911)
 Noc podniebna (Heavenly night, novella, 1911)
 Węże i róże (Snakes and roses, 1914)
 Hrabia Emil (Count Emil, 1920)
 Na torfowiskach (At the bogs, 1922)
 Romans Teresy Hennert (The Romance of Teresa Hennert, 1923), translated by Megan Thomas and Ewa Malachowska-Pasek, 2014
 Dom nad łąkami (House upon the meadows, autobiography, 1925)
 Choucas (1927), translated by Ursula Phillips, 2014 (winner of the Found in Translation Award 2015)
 Niedobra miłość (Bad love, 1928)
 Granica (Boundary, 1935), translated by Ursula Phillips, 2016
 Niecierpliwi (Anxious,1938)
 Węzły życia (Living ties, 1948)
 Mój ojciec (My father, 1953)

Short stories
 Medaliony (Medallions, 1946), a collection of 8 short stories about German World War II atrocities in occupied Poland, translated by Diana Kuprel, 2000

Stage plays
 Dom kobiet (1930)
 Dzień jego powrotu (1931) (The Day of his Return, translated by Marja Slomczanka, performed 1931)
 Renata Słuczańska  (1935)

 Further reading 

 From Corsets to Communism: The Life and Times of Zofia Nalkowska by Jenny Robertson (Scotland Street Press, 2019) 

 See also 
Feminism in Poland
List of feminist literature

References

 Mortkowicz-Olczakowa, Hanna (1961). Bunt wspomnień.'' Państwowy Instytut Wydawniczy.
 This article may be expanded with text translated from the corresponding article in Polish Wikipedia.

External links

 
 

1884 births
1954 deaths
Writers from Warsaw
People from Warsaw Governorate
Members of the State National Council
Members of the Polish Sejm 1947–1952
Members of the Polish Sejm 1952–1956
Women members of the Sejm of the Polish People's Republic
Polish diarists
Polish feminists
Women diarists
Polish women essayists
Polish essayists
Polish women writers
Members of the Polish Academy of Literature
Golden Laurel of the Polish Academy of Literature
Officers of the Order of Polonia Restituta
Recipients of the Order of the Banner of Work
Burials at Powązki Cemetery
20th-century essayists
Recipients of the State Award Badge (Poland)
20th-century Polish women
20th-century Polish women politicians
Flying University alumni